"(I'll Be With You) In Apple Blossom Time" is a popular song written by Albert Von Tilzer and lyricist Neville Fleeson, and copyrighted in 1920. It was introduced by Nora Bayes, who also recorded the song.

Recordings
The song has been recorded by numerous artists including: 
Artie Shaw (1937)
Harry James
The Andrews Sisters (US no. 5, 1941). Patty Andrews of the Andrews Sisters describes how they performed the song "in 4/4 [time] when originally it was a waltz."
Vera Lynn
Nat King Cole
Jo Stafford (1946)
The Four Aces as a B side single to Mr. Sandman(1954)
Anne Shelton
Chet Atkins
Louis Prima
Tab Hunter (US no. 31, 1959)
Rosemary June (UK no. 14, 1959)
Ray Conniff
The Bachelors
Wayne Newton (US Hot 100, no. 52; US Easy Listening, no. 17, 1965)
Barry Manilow
Emmy Rossum.

Popular culture
The Andrews Sisters recording was also included in the 1941 film,  Buck Privates.

References

1920 songs
Songs written by Albert Von Tilzer
Wayne Newton songs